Vidsel Air Base  is a Swedish Air Force airfield located 15 km west-northwest of the town of Vidsel, in Sweden. It is a critical part of Vidsel Test Range that provides an aerospace test and evaluation asset for Sweden through the Test & Evaluation (T&E) department of Swedish Defence Materiel Administration (FMV).

The Swedish Armed Forces, 21st Air Force Wing is the proprietor of the Air Base. By contract between SAF and FMV, FMV T&E use the base as part of the Vidsel Test Range. SAF is responsible for keeping Vidsel Air Base in operational status and that the airport related activities are carried out in accordance with Swedish military regulations.

The airfield is located in the south-east corner of Vidsel Test Range, which is a missile test range consisting of 7,200 km2 restricted airspace and 3,300 km2 restricted ground space.

There is operational support staff at Vidsel Air Base supporting airfield ops at all times.

Facilities

Runways
There are four runways belonging to the base, of which three are operational.

Main runway
RWY A - 11/29, L: 2230 m (7320 ft), W: 35 m (115 ft)

Short runways
RWY B - 11/29, L: 800 m (2625 ft), W: 17 m (60 ft)  (not in operation)
RWY C - 12/30, L: 800 m (2625 ft), W: 17 m (60 ft) 
RWY D - 12/30, L: 800 m (2625 ft), W: 17 m (60 ft)

Aprons
There are 17 apron areas at the base.
The largest are:
A2 (2,974 m2)
A5 (1,800 m2)
A85 (2,175 m2)
A86 (1,925 m2)
There are also 13 smaller aprons, all approx. 400 m2, suitable for single military fast jets.

Hangars
There are two hangars at the air base, both mainly used for the operations at Vidsel Test Range.
The larger one is 1800 m2, and can house several military style fast jets.
The smaller one is 850 m2, divided in two parts, and can house two military style fast jets.

Shelters
There are four shelters for military style fast jets at the air base.

Arresting gear
The airfield is fitted with a NATO standard arrestor cable system, as well as Swedish standard arresting net.

Civil use
For normal air force operational reasons, civilian aircraft are generally not given permission to use the airfield unless such use is related to defence activities.

History
Vidsel Air Base was established as a secret wartime air base by the Swedish Air Force in 1957. It was called "Krigsflygfält nr. 42" (Wartime airbase no. 42) and not put on maps or written about. The majority of work at the base was done by personnel from the Test & Evaluation department of Swedish Defence Materiel Administration (FMV).

The use of the base was both as a dispersed airbase in case of war, and for the newly established Vidsel Test Range.

The secrecy of the base was lifted in 1965, with foreign aircraft using the base from 1966, though very sparsely.

During the 70's the use of the base for training of Swedish Air Force crews increased steadily, and more and more of the operations was taken over by personnel from the 21st wing. In 1980 all training for the Swedish Air Force in north Sweden was moved to Vidsel Air Base.

Vidsel Air Base was completed as a Bas 90 airbase in 1989, meaning that apart from a main runway three shorter runways had been added together with other facilities.

Aircraft operated
Vidsel Air Base is able to operate all current types of aircraft used by the Swedish AF, as well as a number of other aircraft from other users, including many NATO, as the airfield is equipped with an arresting wire.

The following aircraft have operated from Vidsel Air Base:
(Note, list not complete.)

Jet aircraft
SAAB J 29 Tunnan
SAAB J 32 Lansen
SAAB J 35 Draken
SAAB J 37 Viggen
SAAB JAS 39 Gripen
SAAB 105 / Sk 60
De Havilland Venom
Northrop F-5 Tiger
Lockheed Martin F-16 Fighting Falcon
McDonnell Douglas F-18 Hornet
Panavia Tornado
Mirage III
Mirage 2000
Hawker Hunter
Eurofighter Typhoon

Other aircraft
Bristol Bulldog
Caravelle
C-130 Hercules 
DC-3
C-160 Transall

Helicopters
Tiger 
Mi-28
AH-64D Apache
Bell 206 Jet Ranger
Alouette II
Alouette III
Agusta Bell 204
AS532 Cougar

References

Bases of the Swedish Air Force
Military installations established in 1957
1957 establishments in Sweden